Versailles Lake is one of a maze of lakes in northwestern Saskatchewan. It is bordered by many lakes, including Minuhik Lake. It has several deep holes.

History
Versailles Lake is named after The Treaty of Versailles which ended the First World War.
It is also partly named after The Palace of Versailles in Versailles, France.

Climate and weather
The climate is the same as most of Northern Saskatchewan. It has hot days in the summer and cold in the winter. Mild to severe thunderstorms happen every few days.

Fishing
There is an abundance of northern pike, lake trout, and several species of bottom feeders.

Wildlife
The wildlife contains minks several species of birds and the occasional bear and deer. There are also common mergansers, loons and several other ducks.

Plants
There is a massive variety of plants including pine, labrador tea, and leatherleaf. Also many wildflowers.

See also 
List of lakes of Saskatchewan

References 

Lakes of Saskatchewan